Michael Wadsworth may refer to:

Mick Wadsworth (born 1950), English football coach
Michael Wadsworth (sociologist), British sociologist and socio-medical researcher
Mike Wadsworth (1943–2004), Canadian football defensive linesman and ambassador to Ireland